Yatenga is one of the provinces of Burkina Faso, located in the Nord Region of the country. In modern Yatenga, the most prominent city is Ouahigouya (also known as Waiguya). This city served as the capital of the kingdom of Yatenga, a powerful kingdom out of the many Mossi kingdoms, but its influence decreased in the century following French colonisation. The city is famed today for being home to the Naba's (traditional kings) compound and the tomb of Naba Kango.

History

Kingdom of Yatenga
Yatenge was historically a powerful kingdom in the region. It was founded as a Mossi state along with Ouagadougou, Tenkodogo, and Gourma by invaders from neighbouring Ghana. Each of the Mossi states (including Yatenga) possessed a strong military that was able to repel attacks from hostile tribes and nations.

When the European powers began their scramble for territory in Africa in the 19th century, France brokered a deal making Yatenga a French protectorate. Following the annexation of the other Mossi states, the area was governed as Upper Volta until the nation's independence on August 5, 1960.

Education
In 2011 the province had 588 primary schools and 57 secondary schools.

Healthcare
In 2011 the province had 60 health and social promotion centres (Centres de santé et de promotion sociale), 20 doctors and 207 nurses.

Culture
The Yatenga region is renowned for its unique style of Mossi masks. They are tall, vertically oriented, and concave-faced. They are considered to be some of the best examples of Mossi art available today.

A prominent dance of the Yatenga region is the liwaga.

Departments
Yatenga is divided into 13 departments:

Barga Department
Kaïn Department
Kalsaka Department
Koumbri Department
Kossouka Department
Namissiguima Department
Ouahigouya Department
Oula Department
Rambo Department
Séguénéga Department
Tangaye Department
Thiou Department
Zogoré Department

See also
Rulers of the Mossi state of Yatenga
Regions of Burkina Faso
Provinces of Burkina Faso
Departments of Burkina Faso

References

 
Provinces of Burkina Faso